Marileen Dogterom (born 20 November 1967, in Utrecht) is a Dutch biophysicist and professor at the Kavli Institute of Nanoscience at Delft University of Technology. She published in Science, Cell, and Nature and is notable for her research of the cell cytoskeleton. For this research, she was awarded the 2018 Spinoza Prize.

Life and career 
Dogterom was born 20 November 1967 in Utrecht, the Netherlands. In 1990, she graduated from the University of Groningen with a degree in theoretical physics. Two years later, the Fulbright Program granted her a fellowship. Though she found a PhD position at the University of Paris-Sud, she followed her mentor (Stanislas Leibler) move to Princeton University, where Dogterom first began to work with biology via collaboration with their biology faculty. In 1994, she graduated cum laude with a doctorate from the University of Paris-Sud, with a thesis on "Physical Aspects of Microtubule Growth and Mitotic Spindle Formation," and worked as a postdoc at Bell Labs in the United States. In 1997, she became a project leader at FOM Institute AMOLF, a physics and biophysics research institute, becoming head of department from 2003 to 2013.

Dogterom holds professional ties to various universities. In 2000, she took an appointment as a professor at Leiden University, becoming a full professor in 2010. Since 2014, she has been the Chair of the Department of Bionanoscience at the Kavli Institute of Nanoscience at Delft University of Technology. In 2016, she gained the title of "Medical Delta Professor," meaning she had professorships at both Delft and Leiden.

In 2006, Dogterom took a sabbatical for a year to work at Erasmus MC in Anna Akhmanova's research group, which specialized in cell biology and cytoskeletons. In 2013, they received an ERC Synergy grant to collaborate on research on cytoskeleton regulation by the cell.

Dogterom currently leads a team that aims to build the first artificial cell. In her laboratory, her team studies and builds parts of the cytoskeleton outside of the cell, where they can measure the forces they exert on various other cell components. The team also analyses the effects of various forces on the deformation of the cytoskeleton, the interactions of the cytoskeleton polymers as a network, and the spatial structure of the cell itself. Her research group plans to collaborate with various other research groups which focus on other parts of the cell.

In 2018, Dogterom was named as a recipient of the Spinoza Prize, an award that grants a large sum to a team conducting novel research in the Netherlands. Dogterom's former colleague Anna Akhmanova was also named as a recipient that same year. She has been Vice President of the Royal Netherlands Academy of Arts and Sciences from 2020 to 2022. She has become the President of the Royal Netherlands Academy of Arts and Sciences since 2022.

Awards 
In 2013, Dogterom was elected to the European Molecular Biology Organization (EMBO), and in 2015, she was elected to the Academia Europaea. She has been a member of the Royal Netherlands Academy of Arts and Sciences since 2016. Dogterom has been awarded the following grants, fellowships, and prizes:

 2018 – Spinoza Prize
2017 - Engineering and Physical Sciences Suffrage Science award
 2015 – Dutch Physical Prize (Yearly Award from the Dutch Physical Society)
 2013 – ERC Synergy grant (with Anna Akhmanova at Utrecht University)
 2007 – VICI Award, NWO Vernieuwingsimpuls
 1992 – Fulbright Fellowship, The Netherlands
 1991 – EMBO Short Term Fellowship (Heidelberg, Germany)
 1988 – Fellowship from the Italian Ministry of Foreign Affairs (Rome, Italy)

References

1967 births
Living people
Academic staff of the Delft University of Technology
Dutch biophysicists
Dutch women scientists
Members of Academia Europaea
Members of the European Molecular Biology Organization
Members of the Royal Netherlands Academy of Arts and Sciences
Spinoza Prize winners